William Patrick (10 May 1880 – 5 August 1968) was an Australian politician who was a Country Party member of the Legislative Assembly of Western Australia from 1930 to 1943, representing the seat of Greenough. He was deputy leader of the Country Party from 1936 to 1943.

Early life
Patrick was born in Stevenston, Ayrshire, Scotland, to Jane (née Walker) and William Patrick. His father was also a member of parliament. The family moved to Australia in 1881, settling in Kapunda, South Australia. Patrick attended Roseworthy Agricultural College, and later joined his father in Western Australia, buying a farm in the Northampton district. He served on the Northampton Road Board from 1918 to 1930, including as chairman for four years.

Politics
Patrick first stood for parliament at the 1924 state election, but lost to Labor's Maurice Kennedy. He successfully recontested Greenough against Kennedy at the 1930 election, and was re-elected three more times (including unopposed in 1939). In February 1936, Patrick was elected deputy leader of the Country Party under Charles Latham, replacing Percy Ferguson. He also became deputy Leader of the Opposition, as the Country Party had more MPs than the Liberal Party (their coalition partner) at that point. However, at the 1943 election Patrick unexpectedly lost his seat to a Labor candidate, John Newton. Newton was a 27-year-old serving RAAF officer, and was killed in action before taking his place in parliament. Patrick attempted to re-entered parliament at the 1946 Legislative Council elections, but lost to Charles Simpson of the Liberal Party. He eventually retired to Perth, dying there in August 1968 (aged 88). He had married Sarah Maude Sinclair in 1932, but had no children.

See also
 Electoral results for the district of Greenough

References

1880 births
1968 deaths
Australian farmers
Mayors of places in Western Australia
Members of the Western Australian Legislative Assembly
National Party of Australia members of the Parliament of Western Australia
People from Stevenston
Scottish emigrants to Australia
Western Australian local councillors